The Landlord and Tenant Act 1927 (17 and 18 Geo V c.36) is an Act of the Parliament of the United Kingdom that regulates the relationship between tenants and their landlords.

United Kingdom Acts of Parliament 1927
Landlord–tenant law